Professor Rolf Müller (born August 13, 1953) is a German molecular biologist and professor within the Institute of Molecular Biology and Tumor Research, University of Marburg. He is working in the area of molecular oncology with a focus on human ovarian cancer. He is particularly interested in transcriptional networks, therapy resistance, the tumor micro environment and tumor metabolism. This work is intimately linked to the function of the nuclear receptor PPARβ/δ and its potential as a drug target.

Education 
In 1979 he received a Ph.D. from the Institute of Cell Biology and Tumor Research, University of Essen with a thesis on  "Immunological quantitation of 06-ethylguanine in DNA after alkylation by the carcinogen N-ethyl-N-nitrosourea in vivo and in vitro”, From 1979–1981 he was  a Research assistant there, and then from 1981–1983 was a postdoctoral fellow in the laboratory of I. M. Verma, Tumor Virus Laboratory, The Salk Institute for Biological Studies, San Diego, California (supported by a DFG fellowship)

Professional career 
From  1983–1988 he became a group leader at the European Molecular Biology Laboratory (EMBL), Heidelberg, and in 1987 was appointed full professor of molecular biology,  Philipps University of Marburg . For the period 1991–1996, he was also Research group leader, ZMBH, University of Heidelberg.

Awards and honors 
He was awarded the Leibniz Prize (1991) and the German Cancer Award (2000) for his discoveries on the regulation of gene expression by oncogenic signaling pathways and cell cycle regulation. His scientific work has been published in more than 200 articles so far.

References 

20th-century German biologists
21st-century German scientists
21st-century biologists
German molecular biologists
Academic staff of the University of Marburg
University of Duisburg-Essen alumni
1953 births
Living people